Frederick Myron Colby (December 9, 1848, Warner, New Hampshire – May 19, 1920, Warner) was an American writer, educator and politician.

Colby wrote for a variety of publications aimed at youths such as The Youth's Companion and St. Nicholas. He was also a regular contributor to Granite Monthly. He also wrote a series of historical books aimed primarily at children. He was the head of Simonds Free High School in his hometown of Warner, New Hampshire, from 1910 to 1915. He was a Democrat who held a variety of local offices in Warner and ran unsuccessfully for the U.S. Congress in 1908. His wife was the writer, H. Maria George Colby.

References

Henry Harrison Metcalf and Frances M. Abbott. One Thousand New Hampshire Notables (Concord, New Hampshire: Rumford Printing Company, 1919), p. 4.

Bibliography

1848 births
1920 deaths
American children's writers
New Hampshire Democrats
People from Warner, New Hampshire